David Rotchford Stenhouse (born September 12, 1933) is a former pitcher in Major League Baseball who played for the Washington Senators from  to . Stenhouse batted and threw right-handed.

Stenhouse attended Westerly High School, where he was captain of the school's basketball team; he was named Rhode Island athlete of the year after the 1950–51 season. Stenhouse played college baseball for the University of Rhode Island, and was an amateur free agent signing of the Chicago Cubs in 1955. He spent four years in the Cubs' farm system. With the Lafayette Oilers in 1956, Stenhouse had a 16–4 win–loss record and a 1.92 earned run average (ERA) in 26 games. After the 1958 season, the Cincinnati Redlegs picked him up from the Cubs' farm system. He spent two years with the Seattle Rainiers and one with the Jersey City Jerseys, finishing with a 39–37 record over the course of those three seasons.

On December 15, 1961, Stenhouse and Bob Schmidt were traded to the Washington Senators for Johnny Klippstein and Marty Keough. He made the team's opening day roster, and through the first half of the season had a 6–3 record and was near the American League lead in ERA. As a result, the rookie was selected to the 1962 All-Star Game. Stenhouse finished the year with an 11–12 record and a 3.65 ERA in 34 games. He followed that up with a 3–9 record and a 4.55 ERA in 16 games in 1963, and a 2–7 record and a 4.81 ERA in 1964.

Stenhouse spent the rest of his professional career in the minor leagues, spending 1965 with the York White Roses and 1965 to 1967 with the Hawaii Islanders before retiring. After his professional playing days were over, Stenhouse coached the Brown University baseball team from 1981 to 1990. His son, outfielder Mike Stenhouse, went on to play Major League Baseball as well.

References

External links

1933 births
Living people
Major League Baseball pitchers
Washington Senators (1961–1971) players
American League All-Stars
Hawaii Islanders players
Pueblo Bruins players
York White Roses players
Fort Worth Cats players
Seattle Rainiers players
Jersey City Jerseys players
Burlington Bees players
Pueblo Dodgers players
Lafayette Oilers players
Des Moines Bruins players
Brown Bears baseball coaches
Rhode Island Rams baseball players
People from Westerly, Rhode Island
Baseball players from Rhode Island